Ernesta Gertrude Procope (nee Forster) (2 September 1923 – 30 November 2021) was an American investment banker and insurance executive who was the head of the largest insurance agency run by a Black woman. Ernesta Gertrude Forster was born on Feb. 9, 1923, in Brooklyn and was raised in Bedford-Stuyvesant. As a child, he played the piano and performed once at Carnegie Hall.

She founded the commercial insurance brokerage firm E. G. Bowman, Inc. in 1953, naming it after her husband who had died the previous year. In 1977, E. G. Bowman became the first African American owned business to be located on Wall Street. She was also the chairperson of the board of directors at Adelphi University. An investigation of the school's finances showed that it was a customer of E. G. Bowman. For this conflict of interest, she, the president, and sixteen other members of the board were removed from their posts.

In 1972, she presented with the Woman of the Year Award by then First Lady, Pat Nixon.

She died on 30 November 2021, in Queens, New York, at the age of 98.

References

1923 births
2021 deaths
American businesspeople in insurance
African-American bankers
African-American company founders
African-American women in business
20th-century American businesswomen
20th-century American businesspeople
American women bankers
American bankers
American women company founders
American company founders
American investment bankers
20th-century African-American women
20th-century African-American people
21st-century African-American people
21st-century African-American women